The Esquiline Necropolis (Italian – Necropoli dell'Esquilino) was a prehistoric necropolis on the Esquiline Hill in Rome, in use until the end of the 1st century AD.

It came into use when the Forum necropolis fell into disuse in the mid 8th century BC (other than for child burials, which continued there until the end of the 7th century BC), and testifies to Rome's expansion towards the Velian Hill.  Its burials have richer grave goods and are better supplied with weapons, typical of a now aristocratic warrior-class, as already existed in other areas along the Tyrrhenian seaboard such as Etruria and Campania. 

As regards the protohistoric period, the burials are of the advanced "second phase" and, more typically, the "third phase", characterized by more compressed-form (rather than globular-form) pots, with more elongated handles towards the top and more "costolature" than moulded or carved decoration.

Bibliography
 Ranuccio Bianchi Bandinelli e Mario Torelli, L'arte dell'antichità classica, Etruria-Roma, Utet, Torino 1976.

Ancient Roman tombs and cemeteries in Rome